Smt. Radhikatai Pandav College of Engineering, Nagpur or (SRPCE, Nagpur) is an engineering college in Nagpur, Maharashtra, India established in 1999. It is approved by AICTE, New Delhi and affiliated to Nagpur University.

History 
The college was founded in 1999 by Sanmarg Shikshan Sanshta, Nagpur. Sanmarg Shikshan Sanstha has served society since 1985.It has various colleges across the Vidarbha Region in the field of Engineering, Technology, Social Science, Physical Education, Medical Science, Dental Science.

Location 

Campus 

Departments 
 Applied Sciences
 Applied Mathematics
 Electronics Engineering
 Electronics and Tele-Communication Engineering
 Information Technology
 Computer Engineering
 Mechanical Engineering
 Civil Engineering
 Electrical Engineering
 Masters of Computer Application
 Masters of Business Administration

Admission 
Students admission criteria are based on JEE MAIN exam cut offs.

College Fest 
Every year, The college gets its full gaiety mode in its yearly cultural fest "UDAAN" (Flight). Every year Udaan has been organized by the united committee made of different departments of the college. The fest includes different events like Fashion Show, Sports, LAN Gaming, Rangoli, Singing Competition, Mela, Antakshari, Dance etc.

Forums 
There are different active students forums of different departments which works for organizing Technical and Non Technical events in the college.

Forums List 
 VULCAN   (Mechanical Engineering)
 SPARK   (Electronics & Tele-Communication Engineering)
 CRESCENT   (Information Technology)
 EETA   (Electronics Engineering)
 ACES   (Computer Engineering)
 IPSA    (Masters of Computer Application)
 PHOENIX   (Masters of Business Administration)

MECHTRIX-2010 
VULCAN the forum of Mechanical Engineering Department was appreciated for a State Level technical symposium named as MECHTRIX - 2010 which included many talent acquisition competitions like Project Expo, Blind Robot Race, Water Robot Race, Quiz, Poster Competition, Debate Challenge, Paper Presentation. Projects Models from different colleges across the Nagpur University were kept for exhibition. Papers based on different area of Science and Engineering were presented by students of different colleges.

Other Department's forums also used to organize technical and non-technical events throughout the year.

References

Engineering colleges in Nagpur